The Belgium men's national 3x3 team is a national basketball team of Belgium, administered by the Royal Belgian Basketball Federation.
It represents the country in international 3x3 (3 against 3) basketball competitions.

Tournament record

Summer Olympics

World Cup

See also
Belgium national basketball team
Belgium women's national 3x3 team

References

External links

Men's national 3x3 basketball teams
3